Jeanne Goba (1926 – 7 October 1992), known by her pen name Jeanne de Cavally, was an Ivorian children's book writer.

Biography 
Goba (née Wawa) was born to a large family in Bingerville, Ivory Coast, in 1926. She grew up in Tabou and Abidjan. After studying in Rufisque, Senegal, she began a career as a teacher in Ivory Coast, and later became a school principal. She retired from education in 1983.

Goba's first children's book, Papi, was published in 1978. Her pen name, Jeanne de Cavally, was inspired by the Cavally River in Tabou, where she spent her childhood. With the publication of Papi, Goba became the third published woman writer in Ivory Coast, after novelists Simone Kaya and Fatou Bolli, and the first woman writer of children's literature in francophone Africa. Her stories, published in French by Les Nouvelles Éditions Africaines (NEA), centred on the everyday lives of children in Africa.

Goba died on 7 October 1992, at the age of 66. She is considered a pioneer of children's literature in francophone Africa. A children's literature award named in her honour is presented at the annual International Book Fair of Abidjan.

Works 
 Papi (1978) 
 Poué-Poué, le petit cabri (1981) 
 Le réveillon de Boubacar (1981) 
 Bley et sa bande (1985) 
 Cocochi, le petit poussin jaune (1987)

References 

1926 births
1992 deaths
Ivorian women writers
Ivorian children's writers
Ivorian women children's writers
People from Bingerville